The Paulian grain aphid (Sitobion pauliani), also known as Sitobion (Sitobion) pauliani, is an aphid in the superfamily Aphidoidea in the order Hemiptera. It is a true bug and sucks sap from plants.

References 

 http://aphid.speciesfile.org/Common/basic/Taxa.aspx?TaxonNameID=1168856
 http://animaldiversity.org/accounts/Sitobion_pauliani/classification/

Agricultural pest insects
Insects described in 1957
Macrosiphini
Insect pests of millets